The 2010–11 season is the 15th edition of Europe's premier basketball tournament for women - EuroLeague Women since it was rebranded to its current format

Regular season

Group A

Group B

Group C

Group D

Knockout stage

Eightfinals
Game 1 was played 1 February 2011. Game 2 was played 4 February 2011. Game 3 will be played 9 February 2011. The team that wins two games first, advances to the quarterfinals.

Quarterfinals
Game 1 was played 22 February 2011. Game 2 was played 25 February 2011. Game 3 would have been played on 2 March 2011. The team that won two games first, advanced to the Final four.

Final four
The venue was decided on March 8, 2011. Ultimately, Yekaterinburg won the bidding and will host the event at the Uralochka Sports Palace.

All times are local (UTC+6).

Semifinals

Third place game

Final

References

External links
 FIBA Europe

    
2010–11